"Afterglow" is a song by the British record producer Wilkinson. It features uncredited vocals from Becky Hill. It was released on 13 October 2013, through RAM Records, as the fourth single from his debut album Lazers Not Included. It is also included on Hill's debut compilation album, Get to Know. It entered the UK Singles Chart at number 8 and topped the UK Dance Chart on 20 October 2013. Wilkinson and Hill performed the song as well as a cover of OneRepublic's "Counting Stars" in BBC Radio 1's Live Lounge on 17 October 2013. The song was certified as 2× platinum in the United Kingdom for over 1,200,000 equivalent sales.

Music video
A music video to accompany the release of "Afterglow" was first released onto YouTube on 10 September 2013 at a total length of two minutes and fifty-two seconds. The video details a couple's five years of dating by tabulating the numbers, hours, days, and statistics of what they have done together since they first met. Australian actor, Leighton Sharpe, plays the role of Paul in the video and Danish model, Ida Marie, plays the role of Dana.

Track listing

Credits and personnel
 Vocals, writer – Becky Hill
 Producer, programming – Mark Wilkinson
 Additional producer, piano – Brad Ellis
 Backing vocals, writer – Talay Riley
 Label – RAM Records, Virgin EMI Records

Charts and certifications

Weekly charts

Year-end charts

Certifications

Release history

References

2013 singles
2013 songs
Becky Hill songs
Wilkinson (musician) songs
RAM Records singles
Songs written by Becky Hill
Songs written by Talay Riley